Theatre Royal, was a highly popular Logie award-winning Australian vaudeville variety television show produced at BTQ-7 Queensland from 1961 to 1968.

Overview
George Wallace Jnr was the show's main host and star attraction.

The show reproduced the stage of the defunct Theatre Royal in Brisbane, complete with curtains, footlights, stage props, dancing girls, and camera shots replicating the ambience of a bygone era. In 1962 Gladys Moncrieff made guest appearances on the show.
Other people appearing on the show included Brian Cahill, Dick McCann, Gay Kayler and Rowena Wallace. One very popular episode of the show was produced at the RAAF Base Amberley.

The show won six consecutive Logie Awards from 1962 to 1967.

See also 
 List of Australian television series
 The Contact Show
 The George Wallace Show

References

External links
 

Australian variety television shows
Australian television talk shows
Seven Network original programming
Television shows set in Queensland
Black-and-white Australian television shows
1961 Australian television series debuts
1968 Australian television series endings
1960s Australian television series